The 1995 FIVB Women's U20 World Championship was held in Bangkok, Thailand from July 24 to 30, 1995. 16 teams participated in the tournament. This tournament had to be played at Bangkok, Thailand.

Qualification process

 * Poland replaced Croatia.
 ** Peru replaced Argentina.

Pools composition

Preliminary round

Pool A

|}

|}

Pool B

|}

|}

Pool C

|}

|}

Pool D

|}

|}

Second round

Play off – elimination group

|}

Play off – seeding group

|}

Final round

Quarterfinals

|}

5th–8th semifinals

|}

Semifinals

|}

7th place

|}

5th place

|}

3rd place

|}

Final

|}

Final standing

Individual awards

MVP:  Zhang Jinwen
Best Scorer:  Valeska Menezes
Best Spiker:  Valeska Menezes
Best Blocker:  Elena Godina
Best Server:  Elles Leferink

External links
 Informative website.

World Championship
FIVB Volleyball Women's U20 World Championship
FIVB Women's Junior World Championship
1995 in youth sport